For the Summer Olympics, there are 88 venues that have been or will be used for modern pentathlon.

References

Venues
 
Pen